Lance Chilton is a former Canadian television journalist.

He began his career at Citytv in Toronto in 1987, as an entertainment reporter for CityPulse News. He also briefly hosted Toronto Rocks before joining MuchMusic as a reporter and anchor for FAX in 1990. He remained with that program until 1998, when he moved to The New VR (now CTV two: Barrie/Toronto) in Barrie to anchor the station's newscasts. In 1991 Chilton also co-produced and hosted "Internet and Interactive with Bill Gates" a live one-hour special on MuchMusic with the Microsoft founder that explored the beginnings of the internet as a public tool. In the summer of 2010, Chilton left "A" News, to start a new career in real estate. He anchored his last newscast on June 15, 2010.

External links
 Lance Chilton
 

Canadian television news anchors
Much (TV channel) personalities
Living people
Year of birth missing (living people)